John William Crow  (born 22 January 1937) was the fifth Governor of the Bank of Canada from 1987 to 1994, succeeding Gerald Bouey. He was succeeded by Gordon Thiessen.

Born in London, England, he went to Parmiter's School also he served with the Royal Air Force for two years before receiving a degree in Philosophy, Politics and Economics from the University of Oxford in 1961. He spent the next decade at the International Monetary Fund and was appointed Chief of the North American division in 1970.

In 1973, he joined the research department of the Bank of Canada as Deputy Chief and became chief about a year later. He was appointed Adviser to the Governor in 1979 and Deputy Governor in May 1981.

He was a director of Placer Dome from 1999 until it was acquired by Barrick Gold in 2006. He is also the president of J&R Crow Inc.

In 2009, he was made an Officer of the Order of Canada "for his leadership in the area of Canada’s monetary policy, notably as governor of the Bank of Canada, and for his involvement with the International Monetary Fund".

References

External links
John William Crow at The Canadian Encyclopedia
Bank of Canada profile

1937 births
Living people
Bankers from London
People from Toronto
Alumni of Balliol College, Oxford
Canadian economists
English emigrants to Canada
Governors of the Bank of Canada
Officers of the Order of Canada
People educated at Parmiter's School, London